Nagavalli may refer to:

 Nagavalli (film), a 2010 Telugu horror and drama, a remake of the 2005 Kannada film Aptharakshaka
 Betel (Piper betle) in Sanskrit
 Venu Nagavally (1949–2010), alternately spelled as Venu Nagavalli, Indian actor, screenwriter and director
 Nagavalli, a character in Manichitrathazhu, a 1993 Malayalam psychological thriller film
 Nagavalli, a character in Apthamitra, a 2004 Kannada film and remake of Manichitrathazhu
 Nagavalli, a character in Aptharakshaka, a 2005 Kannada film and sequel to Apthamitra
 A single by the Indian metal band The Down Troddence

See also
 Nagavali Express, an Indian railway train
 Nagavali River, India